Blackout is a 1986 Norwegian Film noir directed by Erik Gustavson, starring Henrik Scheele and Juni Dahr. The film follows the private investigator Werner (Scheele) as he deals with a beautiful but dangerous woman, a brutal chief of police and a gangster boss.

Overview 
A police officer suspects that a local husband and father who has recently undergone facial surgery because of injuries received in a car accident is in reality the same man who committed a quadruple murder several years before.

References

External links
 
 Blackout at Filmweb.no (Norwegian)
 Blackout at the Norwegian Film Institute

1986 films
1980s crime films
Norwegian crime drama films
Films directed by Erik Gustavson
1980s Norwegian-language films